Sigurd or Sigur (Pronounced the same) is a Scandinavian male name used in Norway, Denmark, Sweden, and Iceland derived from the Old Norse Sigurðr (from sigr "victory" and varðr "guardian"). Other forms of this name are Sigvard and Siward. A short form of the name is Sjur.

Sigurd may refer to:

Several figures from Norse mythology and legend:
Sigurd, a hero from the Völsunga Saga
 Sigurd Hring, the legendary Danish king and father of Ragnar Lodbrok
Sigurd Snake-in-the-Eye, the Viking warlord and son of Ragnar Lodbrok

Several Norwegian monarchs:
Sigurd Hart, a king of Ringarike and contemporary of Halfdan the Black
Sigurd Syr, petty king of Ringarike and father of Harald III of Norway
King Sigurd I of Norway, also known as Sigurd Jorsalfar (the Crusader).
King Sigurd II of Norway

Several Jarls of Orkney:
Sigurd Eysteinsson, Jarl in the late 9th century
Sigurd Hlodvirsson, Jarl of Orkney (circa 991-1014), killed at the Battle of Clontarf

A number of pretenders to the Norwegian throne:
Sigurd Slembe
Sigurd Markusfostre
Sigurd Magnusson

Other figures from Scandinavian history:
Sigurd Haakonsson (circa 895-962), Earl of Lade
Saint Sigurd of Växjö, also known as Sigfrid
Siward, Earl of Northumbria, whose Danish name was Sigurd
Sigurd Jonsson of Sudreim, Regent of Norway on two occasions in the 15th century. Offered the throne in 1448, but declined.
Sigurd Ibsen, the eight prime minister of Stockholm and Norway, and son of playwright Henrik Ibsen.

In music:
Sigurd, one of the two guitarists and founding members of the blackened death metal band Belphegor
Sigurd Køhn, Norwegian jazz musician
Sigurd Wongraven, better known as Satyr, lead singer and guitarist of Norwegian black metal band Satyricon

In science:
Sigurd Angenent, Dutch mathematician

In military:
Sigurd Kihlstedt, Swedish military surgeon
Sigurd Lagerman, Swedish Navy vice admiral

In politics:
Sigurd Agersnap (born 1993), Danish politician

Fictionals Sigurds 
Sigurd, character in the 1996 video game Fire Emblem: Genealogy of the Holy War.
Sigurd Snake-in-the-Eye, character in the 2013 television series Vikings, based on the historical Sigurd Snake-in-the-Eye.
Sigurd Styrbjornsson, character in the 2020 video game Assassin's Creed: Valhalla.

See also
 Siward (disambiguation), English equivalent to Sigurd

References

Danish masculine given names
Norwegian masculine given names
Scandinavian masculine given names
Swedish masculine given names